The City of St Kilda was a local government area on Port Phillip, about  south of Melbourne, the state capital of Victoria, Australia.

History

St Kilda was first incorporated as a municipal district on 24 April 1855, and became a borough in April 1863. It was proclaimed a city on 8 September 1890.

Council meetings were first held at the St Kilda Police Station, at St Kilda Junction, before the city's first town hall was built in 1859, on the corner of Grey and Barkly Streets.

A new town hall was built for the city, on the corner of Carlisle Street and Brighton Road. The site was reserved in 1883, selected in 1887, with plans drawn up by architect William Pitt in 1888.

On 22 June 1994, the City of St Kilda was abolished, and along with the Cities of Port Melbourne and South Melbourne, was merged into the newly created City of Port Phillip.

The council met at the St Kilda Town Hall, at the intersection of St Kilda Road and Carlisle Street, St Kilda. The facility is now the main council chambers for the City of Port Phillip.

Wards

The City of St Kilda was divided into four wards on 5 April 1987, each electing three councillors:
 North Ward
 West Ward
 Centre Ward
 South Ward

Suburbs

The council area was bounded by Fraser and Lorne Streets, Punt Road and Wellington Street/Dandenong Road to the north; Orrong Road, Inkerman Street and Hotham Street to the east, Glen Huntly Road, St Kilda Street and Head Street to the south, and Port Phillip to the west.

Suburbs within the City of St Kilda were:
 Balaclava
 Elwood
 Ripponlea
 St Kilda*
 St Kilda East (shared with the City of Caulfield)

* Council seat.

Population

* Estimate in the 1958 Victorian Year Book.

Gallery

References

External links
 Victorian Places - St Kilda

St Kilda
St Kilda, Victoria
1994 disestablishments in Australia
1855 establishments in Australia
City of Port Phillip